The Ryons-Alexander House is a historic house in Lincoln, Nebraska. It was built by Charles J. Gerstenberger in 1908 for William B. Ryons, the son of an Irish immigrant and the vice president of the First National Bank. In 1912, it was purchased by Hartley Burr Alexander, a philosopher and author of several books. It has been listed on the National Register of Historic Places since July 8, 1982.

References

National Register of Historic Places in Lancaster County, Nebraska
Houses completed in 1908
1908 establishments in Nebraska